The Kerala State Film Award for Best Comedy Artist was an award given annually in the Kerala State Film Awards, starting in 1972. The award was discontinued in 2013.

Winners

References

External links
 Official website
 Department of Cultural Affairs
 Department of Information and Public Relations: Awardees list

Kerala State Film Awards